Qualification rounds of the Women's 100 metre butterfly at the 1958 European Aquatics Championships were held on 3 September. Final took place on 4 September. There were 17 competitors.

Records

There was a new record during the competition:

Results

Qualifications

Final

Sources

1958 in sports